Erna may refer to:

People
 Erna (given name), a list of people with the name
 Jeff Erna, American drummer
 Sully Erna (born 1968), American musician and member of Godsmack
 pen name of Anna van Gogh-Kaulbach (1869-1960), Dutch writer
 Érna, or Iverni, a people of medieval Ireland

Other uses
 Erna (mythology), a figure in Norse mythology
 Erna (moth), genus of moths in the family Erebidae
 Little Erna, the butt of Little Erna jokes popular in Hamburg
 Erna (planet), a fictional world in C. S. Friedman's Coldfire Trilogy
 Erna long-range reconnaissance group, a Finnish Army unit of Estonian volunteers which operated behind Red Army lines in World War II
 Erna Raid, a former military exercise held annually in Estonia
 Erna, Texas, United States, an unincorporated community
 406 Erna, a main belt asteroid
 Enhancer RNAs
 , a German coaster in service 1922-46

See also 
 Urna (disambiguation)